Edna Viola Anderson (née Falkner; 9 November 1922 – 7 July 2019) was a Canadian politician who served as a Member of the House of Commons of Canada from 1988 to 1993.

The career businesswoman was elected in the 1988 federal election at the Simcoe Centre electoral district for the Progressive Conservative party. She served in the 34th Canadian Parliament. She did not seek another term in Parliament and ended her federal political career as of the 1993 federal election. Anderson died on 7 July 2019 at the age of 96.

She was the granddaughter of James Dew Chaplin.

References 

1922 births
2019 deaths
Businesspeople from St. Catharines
Members of the House of Commons of Canada from Ontario
Politicians from St. Catharines
Progressive Conservative Party of Canada MPs
Women members of the House of Commons of Canada
Women in Ontario politics